Mesolia scythrastis is a moth in the family Crambidae. It was described by Turner in 1904. It is found in Australia, where it has been recorded from Queensland.

References

Ancylolomiini
Moths described in 1904